TinyMCE is an online rich-text editor released as open-source software under the MIT License. It has the ability to convert HTML text area fields or other HTML elements to editor instances. TinyMCE is designed to integrate with JavaScript libraries such as React, Vue.js, AngularJS and Bootstrap as well as content management systems such as Joomla!, and WordPress.

Browser compatibility 
TinyMCE is compatible with the following browsers

 Google Chrome
 Mozilla Firefox
 Safari
 Microsoft Edge

It is compatible with these browsers on any operating system that officially supports the particular browser.

As of version 6.0, released 2022-03-03, support for Internet Explorer was dropped.

API 
TinyMCE includes an extensive API for custom integration.

Plugins 

TinyMCE uses plugins extensively.

In versions 5 and 6 both basic and some advanced functionality is provided by open source plugins.

Both versions also have many proprietary plugins, available only by paid subscription, for further functionality.

Free and Open Source Plugins 

TinyMCE 5 ships with 41 open source plugins including:

 Advanced List.
 Character Map.
 Code.
 Directionality.
 Print.
 Search and Replace.
 Word Count.

TinyMCE 6 ships with 29 open source plugins including:

 Advanced List.
 Character Map.
 Code.
 Directionality.
 Search and Replace.
 Word Count.

The number of shipped open source plugins differs between versions 5 and 6 because

 several version 5 plugins — including Noneditable, Paste, Print, Table, and Text Pattern, — were incorporated into the core TinyMCE 6 code;
 several version 5 plugins — including BBCode, Color Picker, Context Menu, Horizontal Rule, and Legacy Output — were deprecated and removed from TinyMCE 6;  and
 some version 5 plugin functionality — in particular the Spell Checker and the Paste from Microsoft Office functionality — was moved to proprietary plugins, available only by paid subscription, for use with TinyMCE 6.

Proprietary Plugins 

There are 18 proprietary plugins, only available from Tiny with a paid subscription, for TinyMCE 5 including:

 Accessibility Checker.
 Advanced Code Editor.
 Link Checker.
 Spell Checker Pro.

There are 25 proprietary plugins, only available from Tiny with a paid subscription, for TinyMCE 6 including:

 Accessibility Checker.
 Advanced Code Editor.
 Comments.
 Footnotes.
 Inline CSS.
 Link Checker.
 Merge Tags.
 Spell Checker Pro.

File Management 

TinyMCE is primarily a client-side application. It, consequently, does not include native file managers for various server technologies.

Several file manager solutions exist, including several proprietary projects developed by Tiny Technologies, as well as a handful of open source file manager solutions.

Free and open source file managers

Proprietary file managers

Other third-party TinyMCE plugins 

 After the Deadline — A spelling, style, and grammar checking software service with a TinyMCE plugin.

 PDW Toggle Toolbars — Show and hide toolbars with a click on a button.

Language support 
 36 different translations, including right-to-left support, are available for TinyMCE 5.x.x.

 38 different translations, including right-to-left support, are available for TinyMCE 6.x.x.

Product support 
Community peer-to-peer support for TinyMCE is available on platforms such as GitHub and Stack Overflow. Product support is available when purchasing any subscription with TinyMCE.

Themes and skins 
In TinyMCE, themes and skins refer to different aspects of the editor. A theme relates to the editor’s construction, while a skin make changes to the appearance of the editor. 

In TinyMCE 5.x, the default theme is called Silver, and the default skin is called Oxide.

In TinyMCE 6.x the default theme is also called Silver, and the default skin is also called Oxide.

Skins for TinyMCE 5 or 6 can be created and customized with TinyMCE’s interactive skin tool.

In Version 4 of TinyMCE, the first skin tool was created and more skins were made available in the skin/plugin repository.

TinyMCE 2.x->3.x offered various ways to customize the look and feel of the editor. TinyMCE 3.x came packaged with two themes, simple and advanced, as well as 2 skins for each theme, default and o2k7.

Compressor 
TinyMCE also has an optional compressor pack to reduce the overall script download footprint, in the time it takes the script to initialize. The compressor pack is available for PHP, ASPX, JSP, and CFM. A third-party Ruby on Rails compressor pack is also available.

History 
TinyMCE was spun out of a content management system developed by Johan “Spocke” Sorlin and Joakim Lindkvist from their original content management system,  Moxiecode Content Editor,  in 2004.

Release history

See also 

 CKEditor
 Kupu

References

External links 
 
 

Free HTML editors
Free text editors
JavaScript-based HTML editors
Joomla extensions